Spare a Copper is a 1940 British black-and-white musical comedy war film directed by John Paddy Carstairs and starring George Formby, Dorothy Hyson and Bernard Lee. It was produced by Associated Talking Pictures. It is also known as Call a Cop. The film features the songs, "I'm the Ukulele Man", "On the Beat", "I Wish I Was Back on the Farm" and "I'm Shy". Beryl Reid makes her film debut in an uncredited role, while Ronald Shiner appears similarly uncredited, in the role of the Piano Mover and Tuner.

Working on the film as associate producer and writer, this production was an early assignment for director Basil Dearden: "it was relatively easy to fit the Formby films into the new demands thrown up by the war: whereas George had typically had to overcome rogues and villains in his 1930s films, these were now simply replaced by spies and saboteurs".

The film title is a pun, using the colloquial term "copper" meaning a policeman, with the longer phrase "spare a copper" used by beggars - meaning can you spare a penny (which I might have).

Plot
Formby plays a bumbling War Reserve police officer called George Carter who aspires to become a member of the flying squad. The film is set in Merseyside where the battleship HMS Hercules is being built.  A group of saboteurs are planning to blow it up. George manages to foil them. One of the saboteurs, called "Jake", is played by Bernard Lee.
The saboteurs include fellow police officers who plan to shoot Formby in a remote area but he escapes in a motorised toy car. A crazy chase ensues ending in Formby going round and round a wall of death before foiling the plot.

Cast
 George Formby as George
 Dorothy Hyson as Jane
 Bernard Lee as Jake
 John Warwick as Shaw
 Warburton Gamble as Sir Robert Dyer
 John Turnbull as Inspector Richards
 George Merritt as Brewster
 Eliot Makeham as Fuller
 Ellen Pollock as Lady Hardstaff
 Edward Lexy as Night watchman
 Jack Melford as Dame
 Hal Gordon as Sergeant
 Jimmy Godden as Manager
 Grace Arnold as Music shop customer
 Charles Carson as Admiral

Critical reception
 The Times critic wrote in 1940: "the structure of Mr. George Formby's films do not alter very much, and the same blue-print that has done serviceable work in the past was taken out of its drawer for Spare a Copper".
 In a 1940 issue, Monthly Film Bulletin called it "a good Formby film...With a better story than most".
 TV Guide dismissed the film as a "mediocre WW II comedy".
 Halliwell's Film Guide comments, "one of the last good Formby comedies, with everything percolating as it should".  
George Perry wrote in "Forever Ealing", "the notion of unsuspected German spies in respectable positions was to recur in more serious Ealing films such as The Foreman Went to France and Went the Day Well? These comedy films were judged as very good for public morale at the time while delivering an important message."

References

External links
 
 
 

1940 films
1940 musical comedy films
British black-and-white films
British musical comedy films
1940s English-language films
Films directed by John Paddy Carstairs
British World War II propaganda films
Associated Talking Pictures
Films set in Liverpool
Films with screenplays by Basil Dearden